Acrocercops chalinosema is a moth of the family Gracillariidae, known from Java, Indonesia. It was described by Edward Meyrick in 1936. The hostplant for the species is an unidentified species of Bridelia.

References

chalinosema
Moths of Asia
Moths described in 1936